London North Eastern Railway (LNER) is a British train operating company. It is owned by DfT OLR Holdings for the Department for Transport (DfT). The company's name echoes that of the London and North Eastern Railway, one of the Big Four companies which operated between 1923 and 1948.

During June 2018, LNER took over the InterCity East Coast franchise, after the previous privately owned operator Virgin Trains East Coast (VTEC) returned it to the government following sustained financial difficulties. The DfT intended for the company to operate the franchise until a new public–private partnership could be established during 2020. However, in July 2019, it was announced that LNER had been given a direct-award to run these services beyond 28 June 2020, up until 25 June 2023, making it the longest franchise on the East Coast Main Line since Great North Eastern Railway (GNER). 
Early on, the integration of Great Northern services into LNER's operation after the expiration of the Thameslink, Southern and Great Northern franchise in 2021 was being actively considered as well.

LNER provides long-distance inter-city services on the East Coast Main Line; the principal destinations served are Leeds, York, Newcastle upon Tyne and Edinburgh. It directly manages 11 stations, while its trains call at 55 stations in total. LNER's initial rolling stock consisted of a fleet of InterCity 125 and InterCity 225 high speed trains that it had inherited from VTEC. During May 2019, the first batch of Class 800 bi-mode high speed multiple units, based on the Hitachi A-train platform, entered service, followed by the very similar Class 801 electric multiple units during September of that year. Branded by LNER as the Azuma, their introduction has permitted the InterCity 125 sets to be withdrawn from service entirely, along with most of the InterCity 225s. A limited number of InterCity 225 sets have been retained and continue to be regularly operated by LNER.

History

Background
During November 2017, the then Secretary of State for Transport, Chris Grayling, announced the early termination of the InterCity East Coast franchise in 2020, three years ahead of schedule; this action had followed persistent losses incurred by Virgin Trains East Coast (VTEC), the operator of the route. VTEC had been contracted to pay more than £2 billion in franchise premiums to the British government across the final four years of its contract.

In February 2018, the end date of the VTEC franchise was brought forward to mid-2018; the Department for Transport (DfT) had decided to either negotiate with VTEC for it to continue running the franchise on a temporary non-profit basis while a new franchise competition was conducted, or to arrange for VTEC be taken over by the DfT's operator of last resort. On 16 May 2018, it was announced that the latter option was now being pursued and as such, LNER would take over operations from VTEC on 24 June 2018. The DfT also announced that LNER would be the long-term brand applied to the InterCity East Coast franchise. During a speech in May 2018, the Secretary of State for Transport stated that Great Northern services could potentially be integrated into the operation when the Thameslink, Southern and Great Northern franchise expires in 2021 as part of the overall strategy for the East Coast franchise.

The setting up of LNER is the second occasion that a government-appointed operator of last resort has taken control of the InterCity East Coast franchise; between 2009 and 2015, the franchise had been operated by East Coast. It had taken over operations from National Express East Coast after that operator had defaulted on franchise payments to the government, and thus had its franchise taken away. East Coast had been the prior operator to VTEC being selected to take over the franchise.

Changes
A major aspect of LNER's vision for the franchise has been the rollout of the European Rail Traffic Management System (ERTMS). David Horne, LNER's managing director, stated that digital signalling is necessary to unlock the full capabilities of its rolling stock, enabling drivers to continuously receive information in real time, yielding improvements in responsiveness, safety, and reliability over the traditional lineside signalling. The company has worked with Network Rail, the British government, and the trade unions on this endeavour, and has been heavily involved in the planning and preparatory works; it has also undertaking the training of its staff in readiness for its use.

By mid-2020, LNER had considerably curtailed its services in response to the significant decline of passenger travel amid the COVID-19 pandemic. From 15 June 2020, both passengers and staff on public transport in England, including LNER services, were required to wear face coverings while travelling, and that anyone failing to do so would be liable to be refused travel or fined.

LNER is one of several train operators impacted by the 2022–2023 United Kingdom railway strikes, which are the first national rail strikes in the UK for three decades. Its workers are amongst those who have voted in favour of taking industrial action due to a dispute over pay and working conditions. LNER appealed to the public not to use its services on the days of the strikes, as it was only capable of operating a very minimalist timetable on any of these dates due to the number of its staff that participated.

Services
, the off-peak and daily service pattern Monday to Friday is:

This is in addition to the sole one train per day service, which in all, now provides five out and back workings to and from London King's Cross. LNER also plans for December 2019 timetable change that a sixth return service to London from Lincoln will be introduced and five extra services on a Saturday will begin from 7 December 2019. From December 2019, LNER introduced a Harrogate to London service six times a day. LNER expects to introduce two-hourly services to Bradford and a daily service to Huddersfield in May 2020 when more Azuma trains have been introduced.

This service commenced on 13 December 2021.

Named services

London North Eastern Railway operates a number of named passenger services:

Rolling stock

At its commencement, LNER operated a fleet of diesel-powered InterCity 125 and electric InterCity 225 high speed trains that it had inherited from VTEC. Since September 2016, VTEC had also hired three s from DB Cargo for use on services to Newark, York and Leeds. LNER inherited these locomotives and retained them until June 2019 to cover for the shortage of Class 91 locomotives.

During May 2019, the first batch of Class 800 new-build high speed trains began entering service, the very similar Class 801 trains also followed in September of that year. These units are based on the Hitachi A-train design and LNER retained the Azuma brand for the units which was originally designated by VTEC. The initial operation of these units allowed the InterCity 125 and InterCity 225 fleets to be replaced gradually. On 15 May, the first Azuma train to enter service, a nine-carriage Class 800/1, was operated on the Leeds route from King's Cross. Other subclasses of the Class 800 and 801 variants entered service afterwards; the first two five-carriage Class 801/1 sets entered service on 16 September, operating as a ten-carriage train; the first lot of five-carriage Class 800/2 sets entered service to coincide with the launch of the new King's Cross - Lincoln services on 21 October while the first two nine-carriage Class 801/2 sets entered service on 18 November. By May 2021, all units in the Azuma fleet had entered revenue service following unit 800109's return to service, which was the unit involved in the derailment at Neville Hill TMD in November 2019 and subsequently had to undergo repairs.

Following the withdrawal of the InterCity 125 fleet in December 2019, it was previously thought that the InterCity 225 fleet would be fully withdrawn by June 2020. However, on 29 January 2020, LNER announced that they would be retaining a limited number of the InterCity 225 fleet to deliver all of the benefits of their December 2021 timetable. In September 2020, Eversholt Rail Group (the train owner) and London North Eastern Railway extended their lease to ten units by 2023; additionally, there are options to extend the time frame up to 2024. These retained units have been subject to an overhaul performed at Wabtec's Doncaster plant. At the end of service on 15 January 2021, the remaining serviceable InterCity 225 sets went into storage temporarily as part of the East Coast Upgrade. Originally, the plan was to return the sets to service for 7 June 2021, however, the first set actually re-entered service on 11 May 2021 due to a number of Azuma sets having to be taken temporarily out of service for inspections and repairs where appropriate.

During June 2022, LNER unveiled its new livery, based on the traditional British Rail-era Intercity styling, on one of its InterCity 225 sets.

Current fleet

Past fleet
The entry into service of the Azuma fleet allowed all fourteen of LNER's HST sets to be withdrawn from service, with the last three sets working their final services with LNER on 15 December 2019. Nine of the sets transferred to East Midlands Railway, with two power cars from one set transferring to CrossCountry to supplement its existing five sets.

Depots
LNER's fleet is stored and maintained at the following depots: 
 Aberdeen Clayhills Carriage Maintenance Depot – managed by LNER
 Bounds Green TMD, London – managed by Hitachi
 Craigentinny TMD, Edinburgh – managed by Hitachi
 Doncaster Carr Rail Depot – managed by Hitachi
 Heaton TMD, Newcastle – managed by Northern
 Neville Hill TMD, Leeds – managed by Northern

References

External links
 
 

Department for Transport
East Coast Main Line
Operators of last resort
Railway companies established in 2018
Rail transport in England
Rail transport in Scotland
Government-owned companies of England
British companies established in 2018